Lala, is a village located in the Western Beqaa District of the Beqaa Governorate in Lebanon.

History
In 1838, Eli Smith noted  it as Lala; a Sunni Muslim village in the Beqaa Valley.

References

Bibliography

External links
Lala, localiban

Populated places in Western Beqaa District
Sunni Muslim communities in Lebanon